Youwanjela wilsoni is a species of air-breathing land snail, terrestrial pulmonate gastropod mollusks in the family Camaenidae.

Distribution
This species is endemic to Western Australia.

References

 Köhler, F. & Shea, M. 2012. Youwanjela, a new genus of land snail from the Kimberley, Western Australia (Eupulmonata, Camaenidae). Zoosystematics and Evolution 88(1): 25-31

External links
 Solem, A. (1979). Camaenid land snails from western and central Australia (Mollusca : Pulmonata : Camaenidae) I. Taxa with trans-Australian distribution. Records of the Western Australian Museum, Supplement. 10: 5-142
 ABRS. (2009). Australian Faunal Directory (AFD). Australian Biological Resources Study, Canberra

Camaenidae
Gastropods of Australia
Vulnerable fauna of Australia
Gastropods described in 1979
Endemic fauna of Australia